The 2013 EPZ Omloop van Borsele is the 11th running of the Omloop van Borsele, a women's cycling event in 's-Heerenhoek, the Netherlands. The race was rated by the UCI as 1.2 category race.

Ellen van Dijk won for the second consecutive year the individual time trial. Due to illness Van Dijk did not start in the road race which she also won in the 2012 edition. Vera Koedooder was this year the fastest.

Time trial

Results

Source

Road race

Results

Source

See also
2013 in women's road cycling

References

External links

Omloop van Borsele
EPZ Omloop van Borsele
EPZ Omloop van Borsele